Lepidosperma is a genus of flowering plant of the family Cyperaceae. Most of the species are endemic to Australia, with others native to southern China, southeast Asia, New Guinea, New Caledonia and New Zealand.

Species
Species include:

Abbreviations in capital letters after the names represent states in Australia

Lepidosperma amantiferrum R.L.Barrett - WA
Lepidosperma angustatum R.Br. - WA
Lepidosperma asperatum (Kük.) R.L.Barrett -WA
Lepidosperma australe (A.Rich.) Hook.f - New Zealand incl Chatham Island
Lepidosperma avium K.L.Wilson - NT, SA
Lepidosperma benthamianum C.B.Clarke - WA
Lepidosperma bungalbin R.L.Barrett - WA
Lepidosperma canescens Boeck. - SA, VIC
Lepidosperma carphoides F.Muell. ex Benth. Black Rapier Sedge - WA, SA, VIC
Lepidosperma chinense Nees & Meyen ex Kunth - Fujian, Guangdong, Guangxi, Hainan, Hunan, Zhejiang, Indonesia, Malaysia, Papua New Guinea, Vietnam
Lepidosperma clipeicola K.L.Wilson - NSW QLD 
Lepidosperma concavum R.Br. Sandhill Sword-sedge - NSW
Lepidosperma congestum R.Br. - SOA, VIC
Lepidosperma costale Nees  - WA
Lepidosperma curtisiae K.L.Wilson & D.I.Morris - NSW SOA TAS VIC
Lepidosperma diurnum R.L.Barrett - WA
Lepidosperma drummondii Benth. - WA
Lepidosperma effusum Benth. Spreading Sword-sedge - WA
Lepidosperma elatius Labill. - NSW TAS VIC 
Lepidosperma ensiforme (Rodway) D.I.Morris - TAS
Lepidosperma evansianum K.L.Wilson - NSW
Lepidosperma ferricola R.L.Barrett - WA
Lepidosperma ferriculmen R.L.Barrett - WA
Lepidosperma filiforme Labill. Common Rapier-sedge - NSW TAS VIC New Zealand
Lepidosperma fimbriatum Nees in J.G.C.Lehmann - WA
Lepidosperma flexuosum R.Br. - NSW
Lepidosperma forsythii A.A.Ham.  - NSW TAS VIC 
Lepidosperma gahnioides R.L.Barrett- SA, WA
Lepidosperma gibsonii R.L.Barrett - WA
Lepidosperma gladiatum Labill. Coast Sword-sedge - NSW SA TAS VIC WA 
Lepidosperma globosum Labill - TAS
Lepidosperma gracile R.Br. - WA
Lepidosperma gunnii Boeckeler - NSW QLD TAS VIC 
Lepidosperma humile (Nees) Boeckeler - WA
Lepidosperma inops F.Muell. ex Rodway - TAS
Lepidosperma jacksonense R.L.Barrett - WA
Lepidosperma laeve R.Br. - VIC
Lepidosperma latens K.L.Wilson - NSW 
Lepidosperma laterale R.Br. Variable Sword-sedge - NSW QLD SA TAS VIC, New Zealand North Island
Lepidosperma leptophyllum Benth. - WA
Lepidosperma leptostachyum Benth.  - WA
Lepidosperma limicola N.A.Wakef. - NSW QLD VIC 
Lepidosperma lineare R.Br  - NSW QLD TAS VIC 
Lepidosperma longitudinale Labill. Pithy Sword-sedge - Australia (all 6 states)
Lepidosperma lyonsii R.L.Barrett - WA
Lepidosperma muelleri Boeckeler - SA VIC
Lepidosperma neesii Kunth - NSW SA VIC 
Lepidosperma obtusum Kük - WA
Lepidosperma oldfieldii Hook.f.  TAS
Lepidosperma pauperum Kük - New Caledonia
Lepidosperma perplanum Guillaumin - New Caledonia
Lepidosperma persecans S.T.Blake - WA
Lepidosperma perteres C.B.Clarke - New Caledonia
Lepidosperma pruinosum Kuk. - WA
Lepidosperma pubisquameum Steud. - WA
Lepidosperma quadrangulatum A.A.Ham. - NSW QLD
Lepidosperma resinosum (Lehm.) F.Muell. - WA
Lepidosperma rigidulum (Kük.) K.L.Wilson - WA
Lepidosperma rostratum S.T.Blake - WA
Lepidosperma rupestre Benth Kalbarri Lepidosperma - WA
Lepidosperma sanguinolentum K.L.Wilson - WA
Lepidosperma scabrum Nees - WA
Lepidosperma semiteres Boeck. - NSW SA VIC 
Lepidosperma sieberi Kunth - NSW TAS VIC 
Lepidosperma squamatum Labill. - WA
Lepidosperma striatum R.Br. - WA
Lepidosperma tenue Benth. - WA
Lepidosperma tetraquetrum Nees  - WA
Lepidosperma tortuosum F.Muell.)  - NSW TAS VIC 
Lepidosperma tuberculatum Nees - NSW QLD WAU 
Lepidosperma urophorum N.A.Wakef. - NSW QLD VIC 
Lepidosperma ustulatum Steud. - WA
Lepidosperma viscidum R.Br. Sticky Sword Sedge - NSW QLD VIC

References

 
Cyperaceae genera
Taxa named by Jacques Labillardière